Annie Wang (born January 9, 1989) is co-founder, Chief Product Officer, and creative director of Her Campus, an online magazine geared towards college women. She is in charge of building and developing  Her Campus website. Wang graduated from Harvard University in 2017 with an AB in Visual and Environmental Studies, after taking a leave of absence in 2010 to work on Her Campus.

Her Campus

Wang, along with Stephanie Kaplan Lewis and Windsor Hanger Western, is co-founder of Her Campus, an online magazine for college women. The three women proposed a business plan in March 2009 and won the Harvard Student Agencies Investment Award in the i3 Innovation Challenge. Her Campus was launched in September 2009.

Awards and recognition

Along with Kaplan Lewis and Hanger Western, Wang was named to Inc. magazine's Inc. magazine's "30 Under 30 Coolest Young Entrepreneurs" for 2010, Glamour magazine's "20 Amazing Young Women", and The Boston Globe's "25 Most Stylish Bostonians for 2010. Wang, Kaplan Lewis and Hanger Western were named to Forbes 30 Under 30 in 2017 as Her Campus Media.

Personal life 
Wang married Kenneth Fan in 2014. She currently resides in Miami, Florida.

Notes

External links
Ypulse interview
She Takes On The World interview
College Media Beat

1989 births
Living people
American magazine founders
Women chief technology officers
Harvard College alumni
American chief technology officers